ECTACO jetBook is a series of electronic-book reader devices developed by Ectaco. The original device was announced in the United States in October 2008.

ECTACO jetBook

Specifications
 Size: 153 x 109 x 10mm, 6" x 4.2 x 0.4".
 Weight: 7.5oz, 215gr
 Display: 5" (105mm x 80mm) Reflective LCD 16 level grayscale (no backlight) 640 x 480 VGA, 160 ppi.
 Language: Support for e-Book contents in most European and Asian languages
 Bookmarks and auto page turn functionality
 Fonts: Adjustable font type and size - 2 built in fonts (Arial and Verdana) in 6 available sizes from 12 pt to 32 pt, page justification or left side alignment
 Screen rotation: support for both portrait & landscape modes
 Built-in English <-> Russian, English <-> Polish, English <-> Spanish, English <-> German and English explanatory dictionaries
 Built-in MP3 player that supports background playback
 The ECTACO jetBook e-Book Reader supports TXT, PDF, FB2, ePUB, MOBI/PRC, RTF, HTML file formats
 DRM formats: Adobe PDF
 image formats: GIF, BMP, PNG and JPEG file formats
 Memory: 128M (112M available for books)
 SD card slot - 2 GB max.
 Internal Li-ion polymer battery - up to 22 hours
 Colors: Burgundy, Gray, White, Black.
 Pre-loaded with Fodor's Travel Guide and CIA World Factbook. A separate version includes a Bible in English, Polish, or Russian, .

Features
T9 Text Input
jetBook uses the advanced T9 text input method that refers back to its pre-installed dictionaries to complete words as you type them (similar to the alphanumeric keypad on cell phones).

On Device File Manager
The on device file manager allows you to move, rename and delete files. You can also create and delete folders. See folder system below.

Folder System
The Jetbook has a full support for user defined nested folders with the built in file manager or when connected to a PC. The folders displayed on the device mirror the folder structure on the device and the memory card. The folders on the card are combined with the folders on the device. The Jetbooks uses a file naming convention of Author_Name#Title_of_Book.txt in order to list/sort the books by either author or title.

PDF Viewer
The PDF viewer was Foxit PDF Reader. It includes Zoom and Pan/Scroll support. Zoom a portion of the document is allowed. The PDF reader does not support reflow.
In the latest firmware with DRM support was Foxit reader replaced by Contains Reader Mobile 9.1.1 from Adobe Systems that supports text reflow.

Dictionary Support
The dictionaries are in multiple languages and some can be used for translation.

ECTACO jetBook Lite

Announced in the United States in January 2010, it differs from the original ECTACO jetBook:
 Size: 153 x 109 x 10 mm (25 mm), 6" x 4.2 x 0.4" (1.0")
 Weight: 8.8oz, 250 gg with the 4 AA batteries
 SD card allowing up to 32GB of additional storage
 No audio support
 Runs on regular 4xAA batteries (which increases the weight)

ECTACO jetBook Mini
Introduced in August 2010, main technical differences include:
 size close to 5" LCD display; weight 5.8oz
 runs on regular 4xAAA batteries, up to 90 hours runtime on Lithium batteries (and 1 year standby)
 only 3 buttons
 device supports clock and date functions
 audio files are not supported

JetBook Color
Features:
 Built-in memory	
 Display: 9.7" Triton Color E Ink screen, 9.68", 1600x1200 px, with special stylus
Microphone and speaker: Integrated directly into the hardware
PC connection
AC adapter connection
Battery: Lithium-polymer rechargeable battery: 3.7V, 2350 mAh; up to 10,000 page turns on a single charge
Dimensions (WxHxD): 270 x 188 x 11.5 mm (10.6" x 7.4" x 0.4")
 Weight: 23.4 oz (662 g)
 Supported formats: over 14 different formats including Adobe DRM 9.1, ePub, Mobi, PRC, PDB, RTF, TXT, HTML, PDF, FB2
 Expansion: 4GB Internal Memory with microSD card support up to 32 GB

See also
 Comparison of e-book readers
 Comparison of tablet computers

External links
 Official jetBook website
 Company's website

References

Dedicated ebook devices